Cambiasca is a comune (municipality) in the Province of Verbano-Cusio-Ossola in the Italian region Piedmont, located about  northeast of Turin and about  northeast of Verbania.

The municipality of Cambiasca contains the frazioni (subdivisions, mainly villages and hamlets) Ramello and Comero.

Cambiasca borders the following municipalities: Caprezzo, Miazzina, Verbania, Vignone.

Demographic evolution

References

Cities and towns in Piedmont